Aziz Espandar ((born 2 February 1948) is a retired Iranian football player and coach. 
He became the top goalscorer in Takht Jamshid Cup in 1974–75 season along with Gholam Hossein Mazloumi and in 1977–78 season.

References 

Iranian footballers
Malavan players
People from Bandar-e Anzali
Living people
1948 births
Association football forwards
Sportspeople from Gilan province